Shaimaa Haridy (born 1 January 1991) is an Egyptian weightlifter, competing in the +75 kg category and representing Egypt at international competitions. She competed at world championships, including at the 2015 World Weightlifting Championships. At the 2016 Summer Olympics she competed in the Women's +75 kg.

In 2017, she won the gold medal in the women's +90kg event at the Islamic Solidarity Games held in Baku, Azerbaijan.

Major results

References

External links
 
 
 

1991 births
Living people
Egyptian female weightlifters
Olympic weightlifters of Egypt
Weightlifters at the 2016 Summer Olympics
African Games gold medalists for Egypt
African Games medalists in weightlifting
World Weightlifting Championships medalists
Mediterranean Games gold medalists for Egypt
Mediterranean Games medalists in weightlifting
Competitors at the 2015 African Games
Competitors at the 2013 Mediterranean Games
Islamic Solidarity Games medalists in weightlifting
21st-century Egyptian women